Amir Abdul Rehman Cheema  (4 Dec 1977 – 3 May 2006) was a Pakistani Islamist and textile engineering student in Germany who entered the offices of the German daily newspaper Die Welt on 20 March 2006 with a large knife and attempted to murder Roger Köppel. Cheema was later arrested by building security guards. 

On 3 May 2006, while awaiting trial and in German police custody, he was found dead in his cell.

Pakistanis questioned the German's official version of the story and three MPs from a coalition of religious parties introduced a motion in National Assembly of Pakistan to discuss the student's death. While rumors spread after his death that he was tortured in the German prison, the German authorities produced a suicide note for Pakistan's foreign office. 

In the course of the investigation, the German judicial system concluded his death was a suicide.

References

1977 births
2006 deaths
People from Gujrat District
Suicides in Germany
Pakistani expatriates in Germany
Pakistani people who died in prison custody
Prisoners who died in German detention
Pakistani people imprisoned abroad
People from Wazirabad
Pakistani Islamists